FC NSA Sofia (Bulgarian: ФК НCА София) is the women's football club of the Vasil Levski National Sports Academy of Bulgaria, based in the capital city Sofia. The club has won the Bulgarian AFG title every year from 2005 to 2018, so they have played several seasons in UEFA competitions. They have failed however to get past the qualifying stage every season.

Titles
 18 Bulgarian Leagues: 1991, 2005 to 2021
 18 Bulgarian Cups: 1992, 1994, 1997, 2001, 2004, 2007, 2008, 2009, 2010, 2012, 2013, 2014, 2015, 2016, 2017, 2018, 2019, 2021

Former internationals 
  Bulgaria: Andriana Boyanova, Zlatka Gaberova, Borislava Kireva, Lidiya Nacheva, Korneliya Naydenova, Antoaneta Pancheva, Teya Penkova, Petya Petkova, Diana Petrakieva, Evdokiya Popadiynova, Kremena Prodanova, Veni Sarbinska, Roksana Shahanska, Evelina Traykova, Nikoleta Voyskova

European History
UEFA Women's Cup
2005–06: First qualifying round
2006–07: First qualifying round
2007–08: First qualifying round
2008–09: First qualifying round
UEFA Women's Champions League
2009–10: Qualifying round
2010–11: Qualifying round
2011–12: Qualifying round
2012–13: Qualifying round
2013–14: Qualifying round
2014–15: Qualifying round
2015–16: Qualifying round

References

External links
 Official website
 Club at UEFA.com

NSA
NSA
1942 establishments in Bulgaria